Yellowfoot or yellow foot may refer to:

 Craterellus tubaeformis a mushroom with gray underside
 Craterellus lutescens, a mushroom with orange, pink, or white underside, usually found in wetlands
 Harrya chromapes, a mushroom that is white to pinkish with a bright yellow base